First Lake (Nova Scotia) could refer to one of the following :

Annapolis County
 First Lake  located at 
 First Lake  located at 
 First Lake  located at

Guysborough County

 First Lake  located at 
 First Lake  located at 
 First Lake  located at 
 First Lake  located at

Halifax Regional Municipality

 First Lake  located at 
 First Lake  located at 
 First Lake  located at 
 First Lake  located at

Inverness County

 First Lake O'Law  located at

Region of Queens Municipality

 First Lake  located at 
 First Lake  located at

Richmond County
 First Lake  located at 
 First Lake located at

Yarmouth County
 First Lake  located at

References
Geographical Names Board of Canada

Lakes of Nova Scotia